In enzymology, a 6-hydroxynicotinate reductase is an enzyme that catalyzes the chemical reaction

6-oxo-1,4,5,6-tetrahydronicotinate + oxidized ferredoxin  6-hydroxynicotinate + reduced ferredoxin

Thus, the two substrates of this enzyme are 6-oxo-1,4,5,6-tetrahydronicotinate and oxidized ferredoxin, whereas its two products are 6-hydroxynicotinate and reduced ferredoxin.

This enzyme belongs to the family of oxidoreductases, specifically those acting on the CH-CH group of donor with an iron-sulfur protein as acceptor.  The systematic name of this enzyme class is 6-oxo-1,4,5,6-tetrahydronicotinate:ferredoxin oxidoreductase. Other names in common use include 6-oxotetrahydronicotinate dehydrogenase, 6-hydroxynicotinic reductase, HNA reductase, and 1,4,5,6-tetrahydro-6-oxonicotinate:ferredoxin oxidoreductase.

References

 

EC 1.3.7
Enzymes of unknown structure